Timorasso is a white Italian wine grape variety grown primarily in the Piedmont wine region of northwest Italy. There it is used to make aromatic wine with some aging potential as well as the pomace brandy specialty of grappa. Timorasso owes its modern-day existence to Walter Massa, a farmer of Monleale, a village in Piedmont, as the thick-skinned native variety was almost extinct in the early 1980s in the area of Tortona. Thanks to Massa pioneering efforts, by the late 1990s, other local producers began planting the grape variety themselves and there are now more than 20 firms growing and producing Timorasso.

Synonyms
Over the years Timorasso has been known under a variety of synonyms including: Morasso, Timuassa, Timoraccio, Timorazza and Timorosso.

References

White wine grape varieties
Wine grapes of Piedmont